Shearella lilawati is a species of spider of the genus Shearella. It is endemic to Sri Lanka. The specific name refers to Queen Lilawati, who reigned intermittently between 1197 and 1212 in Polonnaruwa, Sri Lanka.

See also 
 List of Tetrablemmidae species

References

Tetrablemmidae
Endemic fauna of Sri Lanka
Spiders of Asia
Spiders described in 1981